Anaphe is a genus of moths in the family Notodontidae erected by Francis Walker in 1855.

Species
Anaphe aurea Butler, 1892
Anaphe dempwolffi Strand, 1909
Anaphe etiennei Schouteden, 1912
Anaphe johnstonei Tams, 1932
Anaphe panda (Boisduval, 1847)
Anaphe reticulata Walker, 1855
Anaphe stellata Guérin-Méneville, 1844
Anaphe venata Butler, 1878
Anaphe vuilleti (de Joannis, 1907)

References

Notodontidae
Moth genera